Kömür is a town (belde) and municipality in the Adıyaman District, Adıyaman Province, Turkey. The town is populated by Kurds of the Kawan tribe and had a population of 3,062 in 2021.

References

Towns in Turkey
Populated places in Adıyaman Province
Adıyaman District
Kurdish settlements in Adıyaman Province